Morten Bruun (born 28 June 1965) is a Danish former professional footballer who played his entire career for Silkeborg IF. With them, he won the 1993–94 Danish Superliga and 2001 Danish Cup trophies. He played 424 matches and scored 35 goals for the club from 1988 to 2001. He played 11 games for the Denmark national football team, and was an unused substitute when Denmark won the Euro 1992 tournament.

He was brought back to Silkeborg IF as manager in October 2001. He managed the club for nine months, and succeeded in avoiding relegation to the Danish 1st Division. In September 2005, he was appointed manager of SønderjyskE where he stayed for eight months until he was fired.

Bruun is currently a football expert for TV channel 6'eren in Denmark which allows him to travel in England and Spain commenting on live matches. He is also coach in IF Lyseng youth department (U13 boys)

Honours
1992 UEFA European Football Championship
1994 Danish Superliga
2001 Danish Cup

See also
One-club man

References

External links
Danish national team profile

1965 births
Living people
Danish men's footballers
Denmark international footballers
Association football midfielders
Danish Superliga players
Silkeborg IF players
UEFA Euro 1992 players
UEFA European Championship-winning players
Danish football managers
Silkeborg IF managers
SønderjyskE Fodbold managers
People from Aabenraa Municipality
Sportspeople from the Region of Southern Denmark